Luke Morrison is an Australian sprint canoer who has competed since the late 2000s. He won a silver medal in the K-2 1000 m event at the 2009 ICF Canoe Sprint World Championships in Dartmouth.

References
Canoe09.ca profile

Australian Institute of Sport canoeists
Australian male canoeists
Living people
Year of birth missing (living people)
ICF Canoe Sprint World Championships medalists in kayak
21st-century Australian people